Lobberich is a German village in North Rhine-Westphalia, situated close to the Dutch border at Venlo. It has a population of around 14,000 inhabitants. Since 1970 the town belongs to the municipality of Nettetal. The art historian Heribert Reiners was born here in 1884.

Overview 

Traditional industries are textiles and mechanical engineering, other products from Lobberich included Rokal model railways and Niedieck velvet.

See also 
Leuth
Kaldenkirchen
Nettetal

References

External links 
 Lobberich Town Website

Villages in North Rhine-Westphalia
Former municipalities in North Rhine-Westphalia